A list of animated feature films first released in 1990.

Highest-grossing animated films of the year

See also
 List of animated television series of 1990

References

 Feature films
1990
1990-related lists